Victor Wei is a Belgian diplomat, who served as the Belgian Ambassador to South Korea in 2007.

References 

Living people
Belgian diplomats
Ambassadors of Belgium to South Korea
Year of birth missing (living people)